Nagar Kovil, alternatively spelled as Nagarcoil, is a small town in Jaffna District, Sri Lanka. Its name translates to "Temple of Nagas" in Tamil.

There is an ancient town in the Kanyakumari district of Tamil Nadu with the same name as Nagarcoil.

The beach has the remains of a large Ayyanaar temple. Once it was an Aaseevagam centre for theological debates and is now under the Indian Ocean. The temple built along the Assevagam centre also was taken away by the ocean.

The Murugan temple in the middle of the town is very special in the locality. Thaipoosam festival is celebrated in a big way with the paternity of nearby villages.

On September 22, 1995, a school was bombed by the Sri Lankan Air Force, killing 39.

See also
 Nagarcoil (Tamil Nadu)
 Vallipuram 
 Manalkadu
 Nagarcoil Forward Defence Line

References

Towns in Jaffna District
Vadamarachchi East DS Division